Robert Carlos Clarke (24 June 1950 – 25 March 2006) was a British-Irish photographer who made erotic images of women as well as documentary, portrait and commercial photography.

Carlos Clarke produced six books during his career: The Illustrated Delta of Venus (1980), Obsession (1981), The Dark Summer (1985), White Heat (1990), Shooting Sex (2002), Love Dolls Never Die (2004), and one DVD, Too Many Nights (2006).

His work is held in the collection of the National Portrait Gallery, London.

Life and work
Carlos Clarke was born in Cork, Ireland and educated at more than one English public school including Wellington College, Berkshire. After school and after a gap in Dublin working in various low-level positions at advertising agencies and newspapers as a trainee journalist and a brief spell in Belfast in 1969, Carlos Clarke moved back to England in the latter half of 1970 and enrolled in Worthing College of Art in West Sussex.

By 1975 he had moved to Brixton, London, and enrolled in the London College of Printing. He later went on to complete an MA from the Royal College of Art in photography, graduating in 1975.

He initially in 1969 or 1970 began photographing nudes as a means of making money; using his fellow students as models he shot for Paul Raymond Publications, Men Only and Club International.

Carlos Clarke's first encounter with photographing models in rubber and latex was an experience with a gentleman called 'The Commander', a publisher of a magazine for devotees of rubber wear who had contacted Carlos Clarke to shoot for his publication. The British pop artist Allen Jones was a good friend of Carlos Clarke. Jones' work drew heavily on fetishism and he advised the younger photographer to lay off the fetish scene. He is "often referred to as the British Helmut Newton".

Personal life
While at Worthing he met Sue Frame, later his first wife. Knowing that she was a part-time model he "knew he had to become a photographer without delay" and persuaded her to pose for him on a chromed 650 cc Triumph Bonneville. In 1975, a couple of years later, they married at Kensington Registry Office.

Death
Carlos Clarke committed suicide on 25 March 2006. He is survived by his wife Lindsey and their daughter. He is buried in West Brompton cemetery.

Publications

Publications by Carlos Clarke
The Illustrated Delta of Venus. W H Allen, 1980.
Obsession. Quartet, 1981.
The Dark Summer. Quartet, 1985.
Shooting Sex: The Definitive Guide to Undressing Beautiful Strangers. Self-published, 2002. .
Zürich: Skylight, 2002. .
Love Dolls Never Die. Self-published, 2004. Edition of 300 copies.
The Agony and the Ecstasy. Brighton, UK: Jane & Jeremy, 2018. With texts by Max Houghton and Carlos Clarke. Edition of 200 copies.

Publications paired with others
White Heat. Octopus, 1990. With Marco Pierre White.

DVDs
Too Many Nights (Panoramica, 2006)

Collections
Carlos Clarke's work is held in the following public collection:
National Portrait Gallery, London: 10 prints, portraits of celebrities (as of June 2018)
Science Museum Group, UK: 102 prints (as of May 2021)

References

Further reading
 Exposure: The Unusual Life and Violent Death of Bob Carlos Clarke by Simon Garfield
 "Interview with Bob Carlos Clarke, TDP Magazine (October 2004)

External links
 Bob Carlos Clarke: his life, work, and death - LatexWiki
 Biography and art
 The Agony and  The Ecstasy: Photographer Bob Carlos Clarke Captures Wild Photos Of Young Lovers Getting Off In The 90s"
 "Bob Carlos Clarke's The Agony and The Ecstasy" a gallery of photos at Dazed

1950 births
2006 suicides
Fetish photographers
People from County Cork
Alumni of the Royal College of Art
British erotic photographers
Irish erotic photographers